The Memoriał Romana Siemińskiego is a one-day cycling race held in the Masovian Voivodeship, Poland. It was first held in 1998 and has been part of the UCI Europe Tour in category 1.2.

Winners

References

External links

Cycle races in Poland
1998 establishments in Poland
Recurring sporting events established in 1998
UCI Europe Tour races